James Hart (born 28 July 1991) is an Irish rugby union player who currently plays for French Rugby Pro D2 side Biarritz. He plays as a scrum-half.

Career
Son of an Irish father and French mother, Hart grew up playing amateur rugby in Dublin for Clontarf FC and also spent some time with grandparents in Toulouse, an area with a strong rugby culture. In 2011, he accepted a trial invitation from French Rugby Pro D2 side Grenoble, where ex-Leinster player Bernard Jackman was a coach, and earned a place in the club's academy. He played his first game for the club against London Welsh. After 5 seasons with Grenoble, Hart moved to another Top 14 club, Racing 92.

On 24 January 2017, it was announced that Hart would be joining Irish province Munster on a two-year contract, beginning at the conclusion of the 2016–17 season. Hart made his competitive debut for Munster on 1 September 2017, coming off the bench against Benetton in Round 1 of the 2017–18 Pro14. He made his first start for Munster on 26 November 2017, doing so against Zebre and scoring his first try for the province in their 36–19 away victory.

Hart left Munster at the end of the 2018–19 season, to return to French rugby and join Biarritz ahead of the 2019–20 season.

References

External links
Munster Profile
Pro14 Profile

1991 births
Living people
Rugby union players from Dublin (city)
People educated at Belvedere College
Irish rugby union players
Clontarf FC players
FC Grenoble players
Racing 92 players
Munster Rugby players
Biarritz Olympique players
Irish expatriate rugby union players
Expatriate rugby union players in France
Irish expatriate sportspeople in France
Rugby union scrum-halves
Irish people of French descent
Union Bordeaux Bègles players